Orcula is a genus of land snails in the family Orculidae. It is the type genus of the family. 

These snails have ovate-cylindrical shells generally measuring about 5 to 10 millimeters.

The center of diversity of the genus is in the Alps. Some species live in alpine climates. In general, the snails occur in wet forested habitat and boulder fields on limestone substrates.

Species 
There are 14 species in this genus, divided among 3 subgenera.

Species include:
 † Orcula alvarium Schlickum, 1975 
 Orcula austriaca Zimmermann 1932
 Orcula conica (Rossmässler 1837)
 Orcula dolium (Draparnaud 1801)
 Orcula fuchsi Zimmermann 1931
 Orcula gularis (Rossmässler 1837)
 Orcula gularis gularis (Rossmässler 1837)
 Orcula gularis oreina Ehrmann 1933
 Orcula imbricata (Jickeli, 1873)
 Orcula jetschini (Kimakowicz 1883)
 † Orcula oviformis (Michaud, 1838) 
 Orcula pseudodolium A. J. Wagner 1912
 Orcula restituta (Westerlund 1887)
 Orcula schmidti (Küster 1843)
 Orcula (Illyriobanatica) schmidtii schmidtii (Küster, 1843)
 Orcula schmidti transversalis (Westerlund 1894)
 Orcula spoliata (Rossmässler 1837)
 Orcula tolminensis A. J. Wagner 1912
 Orcula tomlini Connolly, 1931
 Orcula wagneri Sturany 1914
 Orcula wagneri wagneri Sturany 1914
 Orcula wagneri ljubetenensis Sturany 1914
 Orcula zilchi Urbański, 1960

Species brought into synonymy
 Orcula bulgarica P. Hesse, 1915: synonym of Orculella bulgarica (P. Hesse, 1915) (original combination)
 Orcula corrugata Locard, 1894: synonym of Abida cylindrica (Michaud, 1829) (junior synonym)
 Orcula cylindriformis Locard, 1894: synonym of Abida cylindrica (Michaud, 1829) (junior synonym)
 Orcula dobrogica (Grossu 1986): synonym of Sphyradium doliolum (Bruguière, 1792) (junior synonym)
 Orcula doliolum (Bruguière, 1792): synonym of Sphyradium doliolum (Bruguière, 1792) (unaccepted combination)
 Orcula driana Kaltenbach, 1943: synonym of Orculella driana (Kaltenbach, 1943) (original combination)
 Orcula falkneri Hausdorf, 1995 †: synonym of Nordsieckula falkneri (Hausdorf, 1995) † (new combination)
 Orcula multidentata Kaltenbach, 1943: synonym of Orculella multidentata (Kaltenbach, 1943) (original combination)
 Orcula plateaui (Cossmann, 1889) †: synonym of Orcula oviformis (Michaud, 1838) † (junior synonym)
 Orcula pollonerae (Pini 1884): synonym of Orcula spoliata (Rossmässler 1837)
 Orcula scyphus (L. Pfeiffer, 1848): synonym of Schileykula scyphus (L. Pfeiffer, 1848) (unaccepted combination)
 Orcula striata Kaltenbach, 1943: synonym of Orculella striata (Kaltenbach, 1943) (original combination)
 Orcula subconica (F. Sandberger, 1858) †: synonym of Nordsieckula subconica (F. Sandberger, 1858) † (new combination)
 Orcula tingitana Pallary, 1918: synonym of Orculella tingitana (Pallary, 1918) (original combination)
 Orcula tomlini Connolly, 1931: synonym of Orculella tomlini (Connolly, 1931) (basionym)
 Orcula tripolitana Kaltenbach, 1943: synonym of Orculella templorum tripolitana (Kaltenbach, 1943) (basionym)
 Orcula turcica Letourneux, 1884: synonym of Orculella critica (L. Pfeiffer, 1856) (junior synonym)

References

 Hausdorf, B. (1987). Zum Vorkommen der Gattung Orcula HELD in Griechenland (Gastropoda: Orculidae). Arch. Molluskenk., 118 (1/3): 51-55.
 Gittenberger, E. (1978). Beiträge zur Kenntnis der Pupillacea VIII. Einiges über Orculidae. Zoologische Verhandelingen, 163: 1-44, pl. 1-4. Leiden 
 Bank, R. A. (2017). Classification of the Recent terrestrial Gastropoda of the World. Last update: July 16th, 2017

External links
 Nomenclator Zoologicus
 Held, F. (1837-1838). Notizen über die Weichthiere Bayerns. Isis (Oken), 30 (4): 303-309 (1837); 30 (12): 901-919 (1838). Leipzig
 Mörch, O. A. L. (1852-1853). Catalogus conchyliorum quae reliquit D. Alphonso d'Aguirra & Gadea Comes de Yoldi, Regis Daniae Cubiculariorum Princeps, Ordinis Dannebrogici in Prima Classe & Ordinis Caroli Tertii Eques. Fasc. 1, Cephalophora, 170 pp. [1852; Fasc. 2, Acephala, Annulata, Cirripedia, Echinodermata, 74 [+2] pp. [1853]. Hafniae [Copenhagen]: L. Klein]
 Dall, W. H. (1904). Notes on the nomenclature of the Pupacea and associated forms. The Nautilus. 17(10): 114-116.
  Josef Harl & Anatoly Schileyko & Helmut Sattmann (2011) - Types of the extant taxa of the landsnail genus Orcula HELD 1837 (Gastropoda: Stylommatophora: Orculidae); Archiv für Molluskenkunde 140(2):175-199; DOI:10.1127/arch.moll/1869-0963/140/175-199

 
Orculidae
Taxonomy articles created by Polbot